W. Haywood Burns Institute (BI), was founded in 2001 in San Francisco, California, by James Bell, an attorney, who represented incarcerated youth for 20 years. Bell named the BI after his friend and colleague, W. Haywood Burns, one of the founders of the National Conference of Black Lawyers, the founding dean of the City College Urban Legal Studies Program, and the dean of the Law School at the City University of New York (CUNY).

Its mission is to reform juvenile justice systems across the country that disproportionately impact and incarcerate youth of color and poor youth. It also works to reduce the adverse impacts of public and private youth-serving systems by teaming up with experts across the country in fields including mental health, immigration and schools. It works to ensure fairness and equity throughout the juvenile justice system by working in sites across the country to bring officials from law enforcement, legal systems and child welfare together with community leaders, parents and children, and lead them through a data-driven, consensus-based approach to change policies, procedures and practices that result in the detention of low-offending youth of color and poor youth.

Its program, the Community Justice Network for Youth (CJNY), builds the capacity of local organizations to improve and strengthen their programs and organizations, and to engage in policy work. The BI has worked in more than 40 jurisdictions across the country and has seen results in reducing racial and ethnic disparities.

References

Educational institutions established in 2001
Education in San Francisco
2001 establishments in California